Uzon is a 9 by 12 km volcanic caldera located in the eastern part of Kamchatka Peninsula, Russia. Together with the Geyzernaya caldera it hosts the largest geothermal field in the Kamchatka Peninsula. The calderas were formed in the mid-Pleistocene in several large eruptions that deposited 20–25 km3 of ignimbrite over a wide area. Lake Dalny fills a Holocene maar in the northeast of Uzon Caldera.

The Uzon Caldera is a location of the occurrence of extremophile micro-organisms due to its high localized temperatures.(C.Michael Hogan. 2010)

See also
 List of volcanoes in Russia

References 
 C.Michael Hogan. 2010. Extremophile. eds. E.Monosson and C.Cleveland. Encyclopedia of Earth. National Council for Science and the Environment, Washington DC
 

Volcanoes of the Kamchatka Peninsula
Calderas of Russia
Diatremes of Russia
Volcanic crater lakes
Holocene calderas
Pleistocene calderas
Holocene Asia
Pleistocene Asia